Ranoidea myola, commonly known as the Kuranda tree frog or Myola tree frog, is a critically endangered species of frog in the subfamily Pelodryadinae. It is endemic to the wet tropics of Australia.

Description
Ranoidea myola is similar to the green-eyed tree frog. It is a medium-sized stream and tropical forest frog. There is sexual dimorphism displayed between sexes; males are smaller than the females. This species is generally a mottled pattern of tan and brown on the body and a whitish cream color on the ventral surface but variations occur. A green crescent is visible above the eye (also present in the co-existing green eye tree frog) and iris and the back surface of forearms and legs are fringed as in the similar and co-existing green-eyed tree frog.

Distribution and habitat
Ranoidea myola is native to Far North Queensland, Australia. It is mainly found in tributaries and creeks flowing from the Barron river around Kuranda, Myola, Kowrowa and Oak Forest. This species is threatened by habitat destruction, domestic animal predation, invasive weeds, hybridization and the chytrid fungus. Most of its current forested range has been cleared and has re-grown.

References

Further reading
 Litoria myola in the Species Profile and Threats Database

Ranoidea (genus)
Amphibians described in 2007
Frogs of Australia
Amphibians of Queensland
Endemic fauna of Australia
Taxobox binomials not recognized by IUCN